Danial Temim (born 6 March 1955) is a Yugoslav athlete. He competed in the men's high jump at the 1976 Summer Olympics.

References

External links
 

1955 births
Living people
Athletes (track and field) at the 1976 Summer Olympics
Yugoslav male high jumpers
Olympic athletes of Yugoslavia
Sportspeople from Mostar
Mediterranean Games bronze medalists for Yugoslavia
Mediterranean Games medalists in athletics
Athletes (track and field) at the 1979 Mediterranean Games
Universiade bronze medalists for Yugoslavia
Universiade medalists in athletics (track and field)
Medalists at the 1975 Summer Universiade